Carmel River may refer to:

Carmel River (California), a river in California, United States
Carmel River State Beach, state park unit in Carmel, California, United States
Carmel River (Nicolet Southwest River), a river in Centre-du-Québec, Quebec, Canada